Football Queensland is recognised by both the State and Federal Governments and Football Australia as the governing body for association football in Queensland.    

Football Queensland Wide Bay is the regional office of Football Queensland servicing the areas between the Sunshine Coasty and Central Queensland, including major centres such as Maryborough, Hervey Bay, Bundaberg and Monto.

Role
FQ Wide Bay was established in 2021 as part of the Future of Football 2020+ Reforms.

As part of the reform journey, the local football community was invited to engage in a six-month state-wide consultation process based on improving four key areas of the game: Governance, Administration, Competitions and Affordability. Following the consultation, FQ Wide Bay was created to better reflect the geography and strategic direction of the region.

The FQ Wide Bay regional office has local committee members which are elected by clubs to meet quarterly to discuss functional and geographical matters.

Clubs and competitions
The Premier competitions in the region are the FQPL Wide Bay Men’s and FQPL Wide Bay Women’s, both of which form part of the Central Conference in the Football Queensland pyramid.

References

External links
 Football Wide Bay
 Football Gympie
 Football Hervey Bay
 Football Bundaberg

Club Websites:
 Across The Waves
 Alloway FC
 Bingera FC
 Brothers Aston Villa
 Columbia Tigers
 Cooroora United
 Golden City Soccer
 Gympie Diggers
 Gympie Lions
 Isis FC
 United Park Eagles FC

Football Queensland
Soccer leagues in Queensland
Sports leagues established in 2021
2021 establishments in Australia
Wide Bay–Burnett